The Four Seasons Hotel and Tower, also known as the Four Seasons Hotel Miami, is a 70-story,  skyscraper in Miami, Florida. Located in downtown Miami's Brickell Financial District, it is the second tallest building in Miami as well as in Florida. The tower contains a Four Seasons Hotel property, office space and several residential condominium units on the upper floors. 

The building was planned by Gary Edward Handel & Associates and Bermello Ajamil & Partners, Inc. Post-tensioning reinforcement of the structure was supplied and engineered by Suncoast Post-Tension. The building was constructed with dense steel reinforcing and silica-fume concrete, and is designed to sustain hurricane-force winds. Construction began in 2000, and the building was completed in 2003. The Four Seasons held the title of the tallest building in Miami and Florida until the Panorama Tower surpassed it in 2017.

Specifications
 It surpassed Southeast Financial Center as the tallest building in Miami and Florida.
 The tower has 230,000 square feet (21,000 m2) of Class A office space from floors 8 to 17. They are mostly occupied by HSBC Bank USA.
 There are three lobbies. Two separate lobbies on the first floor and one on the seventh floor. The separate first floor lobbies are for the office/health club portion of the tower and the residences.  The seventh floor lobby is for the hotel and conference areas.
 Part of the seventh floor lobby is a two-acre (8,000 m2) outdoor pool terrace, situated atop the six floor, 934 spaces parking garage.
 The Four Seasons Hotel occupies floors 7 to 36. It contains 221 rooms and 84 condo/hotel units. The condo/hotel units range from 611 to 2,062 square feet (57 to 192 m2).
 A total of 186 luxury condominiums occupy floors 40 to 70. They range from 1,114 to 6,499 square feet (103 to 604 m2).
 The tower contains 10,600 square feet (985 m2) of retail space.
 Total construction costs were US$379 million.
 The tower has a total floor area of 1.8 million square feet (167,000 m2).
 A 40,000 square foot (3,700 m2) Sports Club/LA Miami also occupies the tower.

Gallery

See also
List of tallest buildings in Miami
List of tallest buildings by U.S. state
 List of tallest buildings in Florida
 Downtown Miami

References

External links

Official site

2003 establishments in Florida
Condo hotels in the United States
Four Seasons hotels and resorts
Hotel buildings completed in 2003
Residential condominiums in Miami
Residential skyscrapers in Miami
Skyscraper hotels in Miami
Skyscraper office buildings in Miami

es:Hotel Four Seasons